Ana Maria Padão Gosling (born ) is a Brazilian female volleyball player.

With her club Sollys Nestlé Osasco she competed at the 2011 FIVB Volleyball Women's Club World Championship and with Molico/Osasco at the 2014 FIVB Volleyball Women's Club World Championship.

References

External links
 profile at FIVB.org

1985 births
Living people
Brazilian women's volleyball players
Place of birth missing (living people)